New Taipei City Constituency 10 includes all of Tucheng and Sanxia in New Taipei City. The district was formerly known as Taipei County Constituency 10 (2008-2010) and was created in 2008, when all local constituencies of the Legislative Yuan were reorganized to become single-member districts.

Current district
 Tucheng
 Sanxia

Legislators

Election results

 

 
 
 
 
 
 
 

2008 establishments in Taiwan
Constituencies in New Taipei